An election to Essex County Council took place on 4 June 2009 as part of the 2009 United Kingdom local elections. The elections had been delayed from 7 May, to coincide with elections to the European Parliament. 75 councillors were elected from various electoral divisions, which returned either one or two county councillors each by first-past-the-post voting for a four-year term of office. The electoral divisions were the same as those used at the previous election in 2005.

All locally registered electors (British, Irish, Commonwealth and European Union citizens) who were aged 18 or over on Thursday 2 May 2013 were entitled to vote in the local elections. Those who were temporarily away from their ordinary address (for example, away working, on holiday, in student accommodation or in hospital) were also entitled to vote in the local elections, although those who had moved abroad and registered as overseas electors cannot vote in the local elections. It is possible to register to vote at more than one address (such as a university student who had a term-time address and lives at home during holidays) at the discretion of the local Electoral Register Office, but it remains an offence to vote more than once in the same local government election.

Previous composition

2005 election

Composition of council seats before election

Summary
The Conservatives were re-elected with an increased majority. As in several other Tory councils, the Liberal Democrats replaced Labour as the main opposition party as Labour lost all but one seat, reflecting the Labour Party's declining national popularity at that time.

A notable feature of this election was the number of minor parties and local groups. These included right wing and anti-European parties, that appear to have siphoned support from the main parties and, in some divisions, out-polled them. Local groups enjoyed strong local support, challenging the successful candidates and winning seats.

Results summary
In summaries, Labour and Labour Co-operative results are amalgamated. 
In multi-member divisions, the "majority" is the number of votes by which the loser with the highest number of votes fell short of being elected.

Election of Group Leaders

Paul White (Stock) was re elected leader of the Conservative Group and Tom Smith-Hughes (Chelmsford North) was re elected leader of the Liberal Democratic Group.

In April 2012, Smith-Hughes died after a long battle with cancer. Deputy leader Michael Mackrory (Springfield) was elected to replace him.

Election of Leader of the Council

Paul White the leader of the conservative group was duly elected leader of the council and formed a conservative administration.

White was forced to resign after being charged with false accounting as part of the ongoing expenses scandal. Peter Martin (Chelmer) was elected as his successor, with David Finch (Hedingham) as his deputy.

Results by District

Basildon

District Summary

Division Results

Braintree

District Summary

Division Results

Brentwood

District Summary

Division Results

Castle Point

District Summary

Division Results

Chelmsford

District Summary

Division Results

Colchester

District Summary

Division Results

Epping Forest

District Summary

Division Results

Harlow

District Summary

Division Results

Maldon

District Summary

Division Results

Rochford

District Summary

Division Results

Tendring

District Summary

Division Results

Uttlesford

District Summary

Division Results

By-elections

Harlow West

A by-election was held following the disqualification of Cllr Lee Dangerfield (Conservative) for non-attendance.

 
 

 

No BNP (14.2%) or Green (11.0%) candidates as previous.

Chelmsford Central

A by-election was called following the death of Cllr Margaret Hutcheon (Liberal Democrat).

 
 

 

No Green (8.2%) or BNP (6.1%) candidates as previous.

Stock

A by-election was called due to the disqualification of Cllr Paul White, Lord Hanningfield (Conservative) after he was sentenced to nine months in prison for false accounting.

 
 
 
 

 

No BNP candidate as previous (7.8%).

Chelmsford North

A by-election was called due to the death of Cllr Tom Smith-Hughes (Liberal Democrat).

 
 
 
 

 

No BNP candidate as previous (6.2%).

External links
 Essex County Council election results, 2009

References

Essex County Council elections
2009 English local elections
2000s in Essex